Mwangi is a name of Kenyan origin that may refer to:
Barnabas Muturi Mwangi, Kenyan politician and Member of the National Assembly for Sisi Kwa Sisi
Benjamin Mwangi, Kenyan politician and Member of the National Assembly for Embakasi Central
Boniface Mwangi (born 1983), Kenyan photojournalist
Daniel Muchunu Mwangi (born 1984), Kenyan long-distance road runner
Daniel Waithaka Mwangi, Kenyan politician and governor of Nyandarua County
Dick Mwangi Wathika,(1973-2015) Kenyan politician and former mayor of Nairobi
Ephraim Mwangi Maina, Kenyan politician and Member of the National Assembly for Safina
James Mwangi (born 1962), Kenyan accountant, businessman, banker and entrepreneur. Group Managing Director & CEO, Equity Group Holdings Limited
James Mwangi Macharia (born 1984), Kenyan road running athlete
Josiah Mwangi Kariuki (1929–1975), Kenyan socialist politician
Meja Mwangi (born 1948), Kenyan novelist
Mwangi Kiunjuri (born 1969), Kenyan politician and former Member of the National Assembly for the Party of National Unity
Ng'endo Mwangi (Florence), First Kenyan female doctor, First African woman to graduate Smith College 1961, and First African to graduate Albert Einstein School of Medicine in New York City
Peter King'ori Mwangi (born 1970), Kenyan electrical engineer, accountant and business executive, Group CEO of UAP Old Mutual Group.
Stella Mwangi (born 1986), Norwegian-Kenyan singer-songwriter and rapper

See also
Joseph Mwengi Mutua (born 1978), Kenyan runner

Kenyan names